Raimo Hietala (born 9 April 1946) is a Finnish speed skater. He competed in three events at the 1968 Winter Olympics.

References

External links
 

1946 births
Living people
Finnish male speed skaters
Olympic speed skaters of Finland
Speed skaters at the 1968 Winter Olympics
People from Rovaniemi
Sportspeople from Lapland (Finland)